Rapture is a doom metal/melodic death metal band formed in 1997 in Helsinki, Finland.

History
In 1999, Rapture signed a contract with Spinefarm Records and released their debut album, Futile, in late 1999. The album was also licensed to Relapse Records for distribution outside of Finland. In early 2002, the band recorded their second effort, titled Songs for the Withering. This album sold better than their debut and gave Rapture recognition beyond the local scene, eventually leading them to sign a contract with Century Media. Rapture released their third album, Silent Stage, in 2005. This album continued in the vein of the previous two, with a morose, depressive atmosphere and a combination of both clean vocals and death growls. The band is currently without a record label.

Members

Current members
 Petri Eskelinen – vocals
 Tomi Ullgren – guitar
 Aleksi Ahokas – guitar
 Pete Raatikainen – drums

Former members 
 Henri Villberg – vocals
 Jarno Salomaa – guitar
 Joni Öhman – bass
 Sami Hinkka – bass
 Samuel Ruotsalainen – drums

Discography 
Broken Daydream (Demo, 1998)
 Futile (1999)
 Songs for the Withering (2002)
 Silent Stage (2005)

External links
 Rapture at Encyclopaedia Metallum
 Rapture at Myspace

Finnish doom metal musical groups
Finnish melodic death metal musical groups
Musical groups established in 1997
Musical quintets